Stephen Vitiello is an American visual and sound artist. Originally a punk guitarist he is influenced by video artist Nam June Paik who he worked with after meeting in 1991. He has collaborated with Pauline Oliveros, Robin Rimbaud (aka Scanner) and Frances-Marie Uitti; as well as visual artists Julie Mehretu, Tony Oursler and Joan Jonas.

Vitiello was a resident artist at the World Trade Center in 1999 where he recorded sounds from the 91st floor using home-built contact microphones, as well as photocells and used that material in his Bright and Dusty Things album (New Albion Records) as well as in an installation environment, World Trade Center Recordings: Winds After Hurricane Floyd. Vitiello has had solo exhibitions of sound installations, photographs and drawings at museums and galleries including The Project, NY, MASS MoCA, the High Line, Museum 52, Los Angeles and Galerie Almine Rech, Paris. Group exhibitions include Soundings: A Contemporary Score at the Museum of Modern Art, the 2002 Whitney Biennial, the 2006 Sydney Biennale and Ce qui arrive (Unknown Quantity) curated by Paul Virilio at the Cartier Foundation, Paris. CD and LP releases include Captiva" with Taylor Deupree (12k), The Sound of Red Earth (Kaldor Public Art Projects), Box Music with Machinefabriek (12k), Listening to Donald Judd (Sub Rosa), The Gorilla Variations (12k), and Buffalo Bass Delay (Hallwalls). Vitiello is currently a professor in the Kinetic Imaging department at Virginia Commonwealth University.

Collaborations
Vitiello has collaborated with Harald Bode (posthumously) Nam June Paik, Andrew Deutsch, Tony Oursler, Steve Roden, Taylor Deupree, Lawrence English, Ryuichi Sakamoto and Jem Cohen to name a few.

Awards
Vitiello has received numerous awards including a Guggenheim Fellowship for Fine Arts, Creative Capital funding in the category of Emerging Fields, and an Alpert/Ucross Award for Music. Residencies include the Rauschenberg Residency, Captiva, FL, the Sirius Art Centre, Cobh, Co. Cork, Ireland and at MIT.

References

External links
 Artist Homepage
 Artkrush.com interview with Stephen Vitiello (January 2006)
 Sound files to stream and download
 Stephen Vitiello: Listening With Intent documentary
 Steve Roden and Stephen Vitiello in Bomb''

21st-century classical composers
Living people
American sound artists
American electronic musicians
Male classical composers
21st-century American guitarists
Guitarists from New York (state)
American male guitarists
21st-century American male musicians
Year of birth missing (living people)